Colinas is a district of the Buenos Aires canton, in the Puntarenas province of Costa Rica.

History 
Colinas was created on 16 August 1968 by Decreto 31. Segregated from Buenos Aires.

Geography 
Colinas has an area of  km² and an elevation of  metres.

Demographics 

For the 2011 census, Colinas had a population of  inhabitants.

Transportation

Road transportation 
The district is covered by the following road routes:
 National Route 331
 National Route 625

References 

Districts of Puntarenas Province
Populated places in Puntarenas Province